Trans-Zab Jewish Neo-Aramaic, also known as Hulaulá, is a grouping of related dialects of Northeastern Neo-Aramaic originally spoken by Jews in Iranian Kurdistan and easternmost Iraqi Kurdistan. Most speakers now live in Israel. 

Speakers sometimes call their language Lishana Noshan or Lishana Akhni, both of which mean 'our language'. To distinguish it from other dialects of Jewish Neo-Aramaic, Hulaulá is sometimes called Galiglu ('mine-yours'), demonstrating different use of prepositions and pronominal suffixes. Scholarly sources tend simply to call it Persian Kurdistani Jewish Neo-Aramaic.

Hulaulá is written in the Hebrew alphabet. Spelling tends to be highly phonetic, and elided letters are not written.

Origin
Hulaulá sits at the southeastern extreme of the wide area over which various Neo-Aramaic dialects used to be spoken. From Sanandaj, the capital of Kurdistan Province, Iran, the area extended north, to the banks of Lake Urmia. From there, it extended west to Lake Van (in Turkey), and south onto the Plain of Mosul (in Iraq). Then it headed east again, through Arbil, back to Sanandaj.

The upheavals in their traditional region after the First World War and the founding of the State of Israel led most of the Persian Jews to settle in the new homeland in the early 1950s. Most older speakers still have Kurdish as a second language, while younger generations have Hebrew. Hulaulá is the strongest of all the Jewish Neo-Aramaic languages, with around 10,000 speakers. Almost all of these live in Israel, with a few remaining in Iran, and some in the United States.

Intelligibility
Hulaulá is somewhat intelligible with the Jewish Neo-Aramaic dialect of Urmia and Iranian Azerbaijan. It is also somewhat intelligible with its western neighbour, Inter-Zab Jewish Neo-Aramaic. However, it is unintelligible with the Christian Neo-Aramaic dialect of Senaya. Christians and Jews spoke completely different Neo-Aramaic languages in the same region. Like other Judaeo-Aramaic languages, Hulaulá is sometimes called Targumic, due to the long tradition of translating the Hebrew Bible into Aramaic, and the production of targums.

Influences
The various dialects of Hulaulá were clustered around the major settlement areas of Jews in the region: the cities of Sanandaj and Saqqez in Kurdistan Province, Iran, with a southern outpost at Kerend, and a cluster in the Iraqi city of Sulaymaniyah. Hulaulá is full of loanwords from Hebrew, Akkadian, Persian and Kurdish.

See also 
 Aramaic alphabet
 Aramaic language
 Jewish languages

References

 Heinrichs, Wolfhart (ed.) (1990). Studies in Neo-Aramaic. Scholars Press: Atlanta, Georgia. .
 Maclean, Arthur John (1895). Grammar of the dialects of vernacular Syriac: as spoken by the Eastern Syrians of Kurdistan, north-west Persia, and the Plain of Mosul: with notices of the vernacular of the Jews of Azerbaijan and of Zakhu near Mosul. Cambridge University Press, London.

Eastern Aramaic languages
Jewish Northeastern Neo-Aramaic dialects
Languages of Israel
Languages of Iran
Languages of Kurdistan